Pascal Triebel (born 9 June 1966 in Luxembourg City) is a Luxembourgish cyclist.

Major results

Road

1987
2nd Flèche du Sud
1989
 National Road Race Championships
1993
3rd Flèche du Sud
1995
1st Memorial Van Coningsloo
2nd Grand Prix François-Faber
1996
2nd Flèche du Sud
1st Stage 3b
2003
2nd National Time Trial Championships
2004
2nd National Time Trial Championships
2005
1st Grand Prix François-Faber
2nd Games of the Small States of Europe Road Race
2nd National Time Trial Championships

Cyclo-Cross

1984-1985
3rd National Cyclo-Cross Championships
1989-1990
3rd National Cyclo-Cross Championships
1992-1993
3rd National Cyclo-Cross Championships
1993-1994
 National Cyclo-Cross Champion
1994-1995
 National Cyclo-Cross Champion
1995-1996
 National Cyclo-Cross Champion
1996-1997
 National Cyclo-Cross Champion
1997-1998
 National Cyclo-Cross Champion
1999-2000
 National Cyclo-Cross Champion
2000-2001
 National Cyclo-Cross Champion
2001-2002
 National Cyclo-Cross Champion
2002-2003
2nd National Cyclo-Cross Championships
2003-2004
2nd National Cyclo-Cross Championships
2004-2005
3rd National Cyclo-Cross Championships
2005-2006
3rd National Cyclo-Cross Championships
2006-2007
2nd National Cyclo-Cross Championships
2007-2008
3rd National Cyclo-Cross Championships
2011-2012
3rd National Cyclo-Cross Championships

References

External links

1966 births
Living people
Luxembourgian male cyclists
Sportspeople from Luxembourg City
Cyclo-cross cyclists